Mordaunt Shairp (13 March 1887 – 18 January 1939) was an English dramatist and screenwriter born at Totnes.

Educated at St Paul's School, London, and Lincoln College, Oxford, he spent much of his life as a schoolmaster in London and wrote many plays for pupils to perform. His adult plays dealt with darker interpersonal relationships and The Green Bay Tree (premièred at St Martin's Theatre in London's West End on 25 January 1933 and also performed on Broadway) was originally controversial because of its gay subtext.

Shairp also spent a short spell in Hollywood as a screenwriter. He died at Hastings.

Selective filmography 
 The Dark Angel (1935, directed by Sidney Franklin; cowritten with Lillian Hellman)
 The White Angel (1936, directed by William Dieterle)
 Wee Willie Winkie (1937, directed by John Ford)

Plays 
The Crime at Blossoms (1932)
The Green Bay Tree (1933)

References

External links 
 

People educated at St Paul's School, London
English male screenwriters
1887 births
1939 deaths
Writers from Totnes
Alumni of Lincoln College, Oxford
English male dramatists and playwrights
20th-century English dramatists and playwrights
20th-century English male writers
20th-century English screenwriters